Manuel Gómez Mora (born 16 August 1990 in Guadalajara, Jalisco) is a Mexican professional footballer who plays for Inter Playa del Carmen.

External links
 
 

1990 births
Living people
Mexican footballers
Association football defenders
Leones Negros UdeG footballers
Club Celaya footballers
Inter Playa del Carmen players
Ascenso MX players
Footballers from Guadalajara, Jalisco